Fatih Öztürk (born 14 June 1983) is a Turkish professional footballer goalkeeper who is currently playing for TFF Third League team Yomraspor.

Club career
Öztürk played for Gürbulakspor and Ofspor before he joined Karabükspor in 2005. He has spent seasons on loan with Tarim Kredispor and Pursaklarspor. He now plays for Yomraspor.

References

1983 births
Living people
People from Of, Turkey
Turkish footballers
Süper Lig players
Kardemir Karabükspor footballers
Association football goalkeepers